Botafogo (local/standard  alternative Brazilian Portuguese pronunciation) is a beachfront neighborhood (bairro) in Rio de Janeiro, Brazil. It is a mostly upper middle class and small commerce community, and is located between the hills of Mundo Novo, Dona Marta (which separates it from Laranjeiras) and São João (which separates it from Copacabana).  The word Botafogo also refers to a Latin American ballroom dance move, named so because the area of Botafogo is where it originated.

Etymology 

Botafogo was named after João Pereira de Sousa Botafogo (1540–1627), who was responsible for the galleon Botafogo's artillery. Because of that, he received the nickname "Botafogo" and included it in his family name. When he went to live in Brazil, the Portuguese Crown granted him the land known today as Botafogo. The name literally means "set it on fire" in Portuguese (a reference to the Botafogo galleon's artillery power). In the mid-19th century, English language speakers also called it Boto Fogo.

Attractions and amenities 
Botafogo's beach is within Guanabara Bay, sheltered from the Atlantic Ocean by the Urca peninsula and Sugarloaf Mountain. Attractions include the Home of Ruy Barbosa, the Museu do Índio — which explores the culture and history of the major indigenous peoples of Brazil — and the Villa-Lobos Museum. The Public Archive for the State of Rio de Janeiro (APERJ) is also located in Botafogo.

Sports
Botafogo is the home of Botafogo de Futebol e Regatas, a multi-sport club whose football team is one of Brazil's biggest.

Infrastructure
The neighborhood is served by Botafogo/Coca-Cola Station on the Rio de Janeiro Metro.

Education

The Deutsche Schule Rio de Janeiro (Escola Alemã Corcovado) is located in Botafogo.

References

Neighbourhoods in Rio de Janeiro (city)
Beaches of Rio de Janeiro (city)
Guanabara Bay